Margarita Letelier Cortés (born 30 October 1953) is a Chilean entrepreneur who was elected as constituent in the Constitutional Convention.

References

External links
 BCN Profile

1953 births
21st-century Chilean politicians
Independent Democratic Union politicians
Members of the Chilean Constitutional Convention
21st-century Chilean women politicians
Living people